The 1978–79 Rugby League Premiership was the fifth end of season Rugby League Premiership competition.

The winners were Leeds.

First round

Semi-finals

Final

References

1979 in English rugby league